Peter Cibák (born 2 March 1981 in Liptovský Mikuláš) is a Slovak slalom canoeist who competed at the international level from 1996 to 2010.

He won a bronze medal in the K1 event at the 2005 ICF Canoe Slalom World Championships in Penrith. He also won 2 bronze medals at the 2002 European Championships in Bratislava.

Cibák finished 12th in the K1 event at the 2008 Summer Olympics in Beijing after being eliminated in the semifinals.

Ice-hockey player Martin Cibák is his cousin, Ondrej Cibák was his grandfather.

World Cup individual podiums

1 World Championship counting for World Cup points

References

1981 births
Living people
Canoeists at the 2008 Summer Olympics
Olympic canoeists of Slovakia
Sportspeople from Liptovský Mikuláš
Slovak male canoeists
Medalists at the ICF Canoe Slalom World Championships